Princess Alexandra of Luxembourg, Princess of Nassau and Princess of Bourbon-Parma (Alexandra Joséphine Teresa Charlotte Marie Wilhelmine; born 16 February 1991) is the fourth child and only daughter of Henri, Grand Duke of Luxembourg, and Maria Teresa, Grand Duchess of Luxembourg.

Early life and background

Princess Alexandra was born at the Grand Duchess Charlotte Maternity Hospital in Luxembourg. She was raised in the Luxembourg countryside at Fischbach Castle, and later at Berg Castle, where her family moved upon her father's ascent to the Luxembourg throne.

Through her father, she is directly linked and related to many European royal families, which include; Belgium, The Netherlands, Sweden, Austria, Liechtenstein, Portugal, and Spain. Her paternal great-grandfather was King Leopold III of Belgium, her great-grandmother was Princess Astrid of Sweden and the current King Philippe of Belgium is her second cousin. Her paternal aunts are Archduchess Marie Astrid of Austria and Princess Margaretha of Liechtenstein. Her godparents are Archduchess Maria-Anna of Austria and Prince Michel of Ligne. Her siblings are: Hereditary Grand Duke Guillaume, Prince Félix, Prince Louis and Prince Sébastien. She is sixth in line of succession to the throne.

Education and interests
She attended private schools in Luxembourg, primary school at the Angelsberg School and her secondary education at the Lycée Vauban. She received her baccalauréat with honors in Literature.

Alexandra pursued her university studies abroad in the United States at the private Catholic Franciscan University of Steubenville. After studying psychology and social sciences in the United States, she went on to continue her studies in Paris where she received a bachelor's degree in philosophy, with concentrations in ethics and anthropology. As of 2017, she holds a master's degree in inter-religious studies from the Irish School of Ecumenics with a specialization in Conflict Resolution.

She maintains a strong interest in politics and religion.

The Princess gained International Relations working experience while doing an internship at the Security Council at the United Nations in New York (when Luxembourg was a non-permanent member) where the Grand Duchy owns a historic mansion located at 17 Beekman Place in Manhattan named Luxembourg House, and also while working in journalism in the Middle East. She works as a volunteer helping refugees.

As a linguist, Princess Alexandra is fluent in Luxembourgish, French, English, Spanish, German, and Italian. She is passionate about literature and travel, by which discovering new cultures and languages. She plays tennis regularly, enjoys alpine skiing and currently resides between Paris and Luxembourg. She vacations each summer with her family at their summer home on the French Riviera.

Royal commitments and engagements 
The Princess is an active working member of the Grand Ducal Royal Family. She attends official and royal functions where she is regularly seen using the Luxembourg Royal Family Jewel Collection representing her country such as Luxembourg's New Year celebrations at the Grand Ducal Palace, representing Luxembourg at the Olympics, receiving foreign state visitors, representing Luxembourg on state visits abroad, official visits to the Vatican, royal weddings, funerals, and art events.

In May 2017, she received and hosted Catherine, Duchess of Cambridge, on her visit to Luxembourg. And in November 2017, with her Father the Grand Duke of Luxembourg, she represented Luxembourg on an official state visit to Japan being hosted by Emperor Akihito and Empress Michiko of Japan.

As a child on an official state visit to the Vatican in 2003, as a Royal Princess of Luxembourg using her Privilège du blanc permission, she dressed in white in the presence of Pope John Paul II.

She has been granted High Patronage to the Foundations of Lëtzebuerger Déiereschutzliga and the Lëtzebuerger Blannevereenegung.

Personal life
On 7 November 2022, the Grand Ducal Court of Luxembourg announced the engagement of Princess Alexandra to Nicolas Bagory. The wedding will take place in spring 2023, with a civil ceremony in Luxembourg City due to take place on 22 April, followed by the religious ceremony at Saint Trophyme Church in Bormes-les-Mimosas, Var, France, on 29 April.

Line of succession
She is currently sixth in line of succession to the throne. She had previously been excluded from birth until 2011, when her father issued absolute primogeniture in respect to his daughter Princess Alexandra and all of Grand Duke Henri's female descendants equal rights to males to the line of succession to the Luxembourg throne. Her brother, Prince Louis gave up his place in the line of succession when he firstly married.

Titles, styles and honours

Titles and styles
 16 February 1991 – present: Her Royal Highness Princess Alexandra of Luxembourg, Princess of Nassau and Princess of Bourbon-Parma

Honours

National honours
:
 Knight of the Order of the Gold Lion of the House of Nassau
 Grand Cross of the Order of Adolphe of Nassau

Foreign honours 
:
 Member 2nd Class (Peony) of the Order of the Precious Crown

Notes

References

External links
 Official website at Grand Ducal House of Luxembourg

1991 births
House of Luxembourg-Nassau
Luxembourgian princesses
Princesses of Bourbon-Parma
Living people
People from Luxembourg City
Alumni of Trinity College Dublin
Luxembourgian people of Cuban descent
Order of the Precious Crown members
Franciscan University of Steubenville alumni
Daughters of monarchs